The UIPM Senior World Championships is an annual global international competition in modern pentathlon. It was first held in 1949 under the organization of the International Modern Pentathlon Union (UIPM).

Editions

Note: The years in which championships are held only for women or exclusive to the relay do not count in the official numbering of the UIPM (1984,1988,1992,1996).

All-time medal table

Updated after the 2022 World Modern Pentathlon Championships.

See also
Modern pentathlon at the Summer Olympics
List of Olympic medalists in modern pentathlon

References

Sources
Edition information
GBR Athletics

External links
Union Internationale de Pentathlon Moderne (UIPM)

 
Modern pentathlon competitions
Modern Pentathlon
Recurring sporting events established in 1949